Kaczenice  is a village in the administrative district of Gmina Nowogród Bobrzański, within Zielona Góra County, Lubusz Voivodeship, in western Poland.

The village has a population of 200.

References

Kaczenice